Pazard (also Romanized as Pāzard; also known as Kangān-e Naşrī) is a village in Kangan Rural District, in the Central District of Jask County, Hormozgan Province, Iran. At the 2006 census, its population was 166, in 29 families.

References 

Populated places in Jask County